"Mother's Little Helpers" is the series premiere of Helstrom. It stars Tom Austen as Daimon Helstrom, Sydney Lemmon as Ana Helstrom, and Elizabeth Marvel as Victoria Helstrom, among others. The plot follows the Helstrom siblings, Daimon, an exorcist working with Louise Hastings in Portland until Hastings introduces him to Gabriella Rossetti, and Ana, who is working with business partner Chris Yen to kill those who deserve it under the cover that they are antique dealers. Both Helstrom siblings have necromantic powers.

The episode is set in the Marvel Cinematic Universe (MCU) and shares continuity with the other films and television series of the franchise. "Mother's Little Helpers" was released on Hulu on October 16, 2020, as part of the Huluween programming block.

Plot 
Helstrom siblings Daimon (in Portland) and Ana (in San Francisco) both have necromantic superpowers. Daimon both works as an ethics professor and aids Louise Hastings at the Saint Teresa Center for Mental Health, in which his mother Victoria resides after being possessed by a demon who calls herself "Mother". Ana works with Chris Yen at an auction house, though really that is only a cover for what they really do—murder those who deserve it. Victoria's husband and the kids' father was a Satanism serial killer named Marduk Helstrom. After talking to Victoria, Louise strongly suggests that Daimon work with Gabriella Rossetti, a Vatican nun-in-training.

Soon after the two meet, Keith Spivey, a security guard in Saint Teresa's goes missing, followed by a raid on a demonic tomb. Ana and ally Caretaker (real name Henry) find a mysterious skeleton in the tomb, and Ana grabs a one-eyed skull found at the scene to examine. Mother draws a symbol on the wall of her cell at Saint Teresa's. It is the same symbol on the skull Ana found. Meanwhile, Spivey, possessed by demon Basar, attacks trucker Alex Tilden at a Roxxon gas station.

Production

Development 
In May 2019, Hulu ordered Marvel's Helstrom to series, based on the Marvel Comics characters Daimon and Satana Hellstrom; their names being changed to Daimon and Ana Helstrom for the series. In 2020, prior to the premiere of the series, the Writers Guild of America West revealed the episode title, along with Paul Zbyszewski's attachment as the teleplay and story writer for the episode. The remaining episode titles and their respective writer's credits were announced on the website on May 14.

The episode is written by Paul Zbyszewski, who would later go on to write the tenth and final episode, and directed by Diana Reid. The episode is Reid's only directorial credit. Helstrom was cancelled on December 14, 2020, making it the last Marvel Television series to be produced before its absorption into Marvel Studios.

Casting 
The episode stars Tom Austen and Sydney Lemmon as Daimon and Ana Helstrom (whose counterpart in the Marvel Comics is named Satana). Also introduced in the episode are Elizabeth Marvel, Robert Wisdom, Ariana Guerra, June Carryl, and Alain Uy as Victoria Helstrom, Daimon and Ana's mother who has been institutionalized for over 20 years; Henry / Caretaker, a good friend of Louise Hastings; Gabriella Rosetti, a nun in-training; Louise Hastings, the woman who runs the Saint Teresa's Center for Mental Health; and Chris Yen, a man who works with Ana to kill people while maintaining a cover of selling antiques.

Also in the episode, Jesse James Baldwin briefly appears as Archer Cavallo, a young boy pretending to be possessed by a demon. Other guest roles include Eric Gustavson as Edward Tate, a rich man who Ana kills for having murdered seven women and Sandy Robson as Alex Tilden, a trucker possessed by the demon Basar at a Roxxon Energy Corporation gas station.

Tie-ins 
Featured in the series is a Roxxon Energy Corporation gas station, something seen all throughout the MCU and an Easter egg to the Marvel Comics, featured in multiple episodes of Cloak & Dagger and Agent Carter, as well as in the ninth episode of Agents of S.H.I.E.L.D., "Repairs", and in the Marvel One-Shot A Funny Thing Happened on the Way to Thor's Hammer and in the feature film Iron Man 3. A logo on a bar in the episode shares similarities with that found throughout the Marvel's Netflix television series.

For the most part, no other major tie-ins to the rest of the MCU are featured in the series. Originally, Helstrom was to be the first in a series of television show in the MCU called "Adventure Into Fear". A series focusing on Ghost Rider was in development, but production was shut down before filming could begin when Hulu decided not to move forward with the series. After Marvel Television folded into Marvel Studios, the rest of the "Adventure Into Fear" franchise was scrapped and only the first season Helstrom was produced.

Release 
The episode was released simultaneously with the rest of the series on October 16, 2020. On Star, Helstrom was aired as an original series, with the premiere episode debuting on the streaming service provider on February 23, 2021. A week prior to the series' release, Hulu released the first 10 minutes of "Mother's Little Helpers" at the New York Comic Con online panel on October 9, 2020.

Reception 
For the series, review aggregator Rotten Tomatoes reported an approval rating of 27% based on 26 reviews, with an average rating of 4.97/10. The website's critics consensus reads, "Helstrom strong visual effects can't save it from the fact that its characters simply aren't interesting enough to overcome their familiar setting." Metacritic, which uses a weighted average, assigned a score of 40 out of 100 based on 9 critics, indicating "mixed or average reviews". In reviewing the first episode, Robbie Pleasant of Multiversity Comics criticized the starring characters, Daimon and Ana Helstrom, for not sharing similarities to their Marvel Comics counterparts, commenting also on the backstory of the Helstrom family and the supporting characters. Pleasant also claimed that the series was "missing the Marvel connection", as Helstrom was originally meant to be the first television series in the "Adventure into Fear" franchise before it was cancelled.

Martin Carr of Flickering Myth compared the show to NBC's Constantine series, which also followed an exorcist and was cancelled after one season, though also saying "yet [Helstrom] feels expansive, less formulaic and more invested. A theological emissary provides essential scepticism, while medical opinions ground the whole endeavour with reasoned logic." Carr still praised some aspects of the series, saying "At just under an hour it also feels full bodied, draws you in quickly and delivers the basis for a series which has every right to get a second season. This might not be Daredevil but given time it could be." A review on Metawitches also spoke of the traumatized past through which the Helstrom children lived, saying it was not unlike that in Marvel's Netflix television series, such as Iron Fist and The Defenders.

See also 
 Marvel Cinematic Universe television series

References

External links 

2020 television episodes
Marvel Cinematic Universe episodes